John Rea Jamison (born 30 November 1948) is a Northern Irish former professional footballer who played as a midfielder.

Career
Born in Belfast, Jamison played for Dundela, Crusaders and Glentoran. He also earned one cap for the Northern Ireland national team.

References

1958 births
Living people
Association footballers from Northern Ireland
Northern Ireland international footballers
Dundela F.C. players
Crusaders F.C. players
Glentoran F.C. players
NIFL Premiership players
Association football midfielders